Lucas Martín Villafáñez (born 4 October 1991) is an Argentine professional footballer who plays as an attacking midfielder for Cypriot First Division club APOEL. He plays mainly as an attacking midfielder but also can play as a midfielder.

Club career
Villafáñez made his professional debut in the Primera B Nacional with his hometown club Comisión de Actividades Infantiles, when he was 16 years old. In total he played 57 games with the club, scoring 12 goals.

In 2010, Independiente acquired the player on a one-year loan deal. He debuted in the Argentine Primera División on a 0–1 defeat to Tigre for the 2010 Apertura, despite the game being played in February 2011.

On 2 May 2011, Villafáñez scored his first goal with Independiente, in a 1–1 draw with Boca Juniors.

In summer 2013, the hitch that had a contract until June 2014 and would not be taken into account by Miguel Angel Brindisi was asked by Antonio Mohamed after his arrival in Huracán F.C. and eventually would be signing with the "Globe". After several days of negotiation and obstacles, it was finally decided that Villafáñez would go on loan to Huracán F.C. for the 2013–14 season. On 1 August 2014, Villafáñez signed a two-year contract with Greek Super League side Panetolikos on loan from Independiente, along with his former Independiente teammates Fernando Godoy and Nicolás Martinez.

In December 2015, Villafáñez was linked with a move to AEK Athens. On 24 January 2016, he scored with a close-range effort at the beginning of a match against Veria which Panetolikos won 1–0 and scooped its first away victory since August 2015.

Panathinaikos
On 27 January 2016, Panathinaikos bought the Villafáñez's playing rights from Independiente, so from the summer of 2016, he would have belonged to the "Greens". Panetolikos, however, wanted to make a profit form the player's transfer and gave him to Panathinaikos from 1 February.
On 6 March 2016, he scored his first goal with the club in a 2–0 home win against Atromitos. On 28 October 2017, thanks to a close-range effort by the Argentinian attacking midfielder, Panathinaikos won 1–0 at Super League derby clash against champions Olympiacos. On 7 January 2018, Marinos Ouzounidis’ team, which had last tasted victory in the Super League back on 28 October with a 1–0 derby win over Olympiacos, finally stopped the rot in the first game of 2018 thanks to a pair of penalties from Villafáñez in a 2–0 win home game against Platanias.

On 14 January 2018, with Panathinaikos in financial difficulties, French website "Foot Mercato" reported Villafáñez had been offered to three Ligue 1 clubs, namely Nantes, Saint-Étienne and Toulouse for the January transfer window on a loan basis till the end of the season with a purchase option in the range of €2 million for the summer of 2018.

Villafáñez left the club having 73 appearances (10 goals, 13 assists) in all competitions.

Alanyaspor
On 23 January 2018, Turkish club Alanyaspor initially offered an €800,000 transfer fee to Panathinaikos for Villafáñez. The transfer offer involved two Greek internationals, Giorgos Tzavellas and Giannis Maniatis. According to various sources, the transfer could be set in the range of €1.1 million, with Villafáñez agreeing to a 2.5-year contract, with annual earnings levelled to €800,000 per year. After three days of negotiations, Panathinaikos agreed with Alanyaspor for a total transfer amount of €1.2 million. The financial struggling Greens will receive a net amount of €900,000, as Villafáñez ex-club Panetolikos retained a 10% resale rate, while from the total transfer amount Panathinaikos will cover his debt both to the player's rights from Independiente and his annual delayed salary. On 27 January 2018, two days after his arrival, he made his debut with the club as a starter in a 3–1 home win game against Alanyaspor. On 18 May 2018, in the last matchday of the season he scored his first goal with the club in a 3–2 home win game against Antalyaspor.

Morelia
On 3 July 2019, Monarcas Morelia presented Villafáñez as their new player.

Return to Panathinaikos
In July 2020, Villafáñez returned to the Greek giants Panathinaikos F.C. with a two year deal from Monarcas Morelia.

International career
Villafáñez was part of Sergio Batista's Argentina U-20 national team in 2010. In 2011, he was selected to represent Argentina at the FIFA U-20 World Cup. Villafanez also, expressed his desire to play for Greece national football team, through his maternal great-grandfather, who was born in Piraeus.

In 2014, Villafáñez started the procedure in order to claim the Greek citizenship, due to his great-grandfather who was from Piraeus, in order to be eligible for the Greece national football team. In December 2017, he was in the final stages for acquiring the citizenship and was to be available for the national team.

Honours
Panathinaikos
Greek Cup: 2021–22

References

External links
 
  

Living people
1991 births
Argentine footballers
Argentine Primera División players
Association football wingers
Association football midfielders
Argentina under-20 international footballers
Medalists at the 2011 Pan American Games
Pan American Games medalists in football
Pan American Games silver medalists for Argentina
Footballers at the 2011 Pan American Games
Primera Nacional players
Super League Greece players
Süper Lig players
Liga MX players
Comisión de Actividades Infantiles footballers
Club Atlético Independiente footballers
Club Atlético Huracán footballers
Panetolikos F.C. players
Panathinaikos F.C. players
Alanyaspor footballers
Atlético Morelia players
Argentine expatriate footballers
Argentine expatriate sportspeople in Greece
Expatriate footballers in Greece
Argentine expatriate sportspeople in Mexico
Expatriate footballers in Mexico
Argentine expatriate sportspeople in Turkey
Expatriate footballers in Turkey
People from Chubut Province
Expatriate footballers in Cyprus
APOEL FC players
Cypriot First Division players